Holger Juul Hansen (14 August 1924 – 19 March 2013) was a Danish actor. 

Hansen starred in a large number of Danish movies and television shows. His most prominent roles were as banker Hans Christian Varnæs, head of one of the two rival families in Matador, and as Professor Moesgaard in The Kingdom.

Selected filmography
Tine (1964)
Matador – a Danish TV series produced and shown between 1978 and 1982.The Kingdom – a Danish television mini-serie created by Lars von Trier.

References

External links

1924 births
2013 deaths
20th-century Danish male actors
Danish male television actors
Best Actor Bodil Award winners
Danish male film actors
People from Nyborg